History and Technology is a quarterly peer reviewed academic journal devoted to publishing papers on all aspects of the history of technology. It was established in 1983. One of the founding editors was Pietro Redondi. The subjects range from ancient and classical times to the present day. Previously published by Gordon & Breach, the current publisher is Taylor & Francis.

External links
 

History of technology journals
Publications established in 1983
Quarterly journals
English-language journals
Taylor & Francis academic journals